Stigmatophora grisea is a moth in the subfamily Arctiinae. It was described by Hering in 1936. It is found in China (Kansu).

References

Natural History Museum Lepidoptera generic names catalog

Moths described in 1936
Lithosiini
Moths of Asia